Bujar M. Osmani (born 11 September 1979) is a Macedonian politician of Albanian descent serving as the current Minister of Foreign Affairs of North Macedonia and former Minister of Health. In June 2017, he was appointed Deputy Prime Minister in charge of European affairs. On 30 August 2020, Osmani became Minister of Foreign Affairs. Osmani was the first Macedonian of Albanian descent to lead the top diplomatic post in North Macedonia.

He was previously a doctor at the Public Hospital in Skopje.

On 26 November 2019, an earthquake struck Albania. Osmani was part of a delegation of Albanian politicians from North Macedonia visiting the earthquake epicentre that expressed their condolences to Albanian president Ilir Meta.

With North Macedonia assuming the Chairmanship of the Organization for Security and Co-operation in Europe for 2023, Osmani became the Chairperson-in-Office of the OSCE on 1 January 2023.

References

External links

|-

1979 births
Living people
Politicians from Skopje
Macedonian physicians
Democratic Union for Integration politicians
Deputy Prime Ministers of North Macedonia
Health ministers of North Macedonia
Foreign Ministers of North Macedonia
Albanians in North Macedonia